Shane Brolly is an Irish actor, writer, and director from Belfast, Northern Ireland, most known for his role as Kraven in the Underworld franchise.

Life and career 
Brolly was born in Belfast, Northern Ireland, and comes from a family of Irish actors, although he has done most of his film work in the United States. After some independent films, he played a small role in the science fiction thriller Impostor, based on a story by Philip K. Dick. His most notable role to date is in Underworld as Kraven. He reprised the role for Underworld: Evolution and Underworld: Rise of the Lycans. He starred in CSI: NY in 2007 in the final episode of Season 3 "Snow Day". Besides acting, Brolly writes and directs films. His first short film, Y's Guys, was well received at the Atlanta, New York and Daytona Beach film festivals.

Brolly lives in Beverly Hills with his wife, actress Sarah G. Buxton. The couple married on 27 November 2006. On 20 December 2006, Sarah gave birth to the couple's first child, a son named Finn Michael Brolly.

Literary works

Filmography

References

External links 
 

Living people
Male actors from Belfast
Male film actors from Northern Ireland
Male television actors from Northern Ireland
20th-century male actors from Northern Ireland
21st-century male actors from Northern Ireland
Expatriates from Northern Ireland in the United States
Year of birth missing (living people)